Iván Amaya Carazo (born 3 September 1978) is a Spanish retired footballer who played as a central defender.

Club career
Born in Madrid, Amaya started his professional career at hometown's Rayo Vallecano, totalling 31 games with the first team in his first two seasons, the first of which was spent in the Segunda División with promotion. After that, he returned to the second tier but stayed in the city, joining Atlético Madrid for another couple of years and being rarely utilised.

After another unassuming La Liga spell with RCD Espanyol, Amaya appeared in 40 matches for Getafe CF in 2003–04, promoting to the top flight for the third time (a first-ever for Getafe). However, he featured very rarely the following campaign, returning to division two in January 2005 as he joined Ciudad de Murcia.

Amaya then spent two seasons in the second tier, with Elche CF. In July 2009 he was bought by Udinese Calcio, being immediately loaned back to Spain with lowly Granada CF; compatriot Óscar Pérez, who was also purchased by the Italians, made the same season-long move as seven other players, after the two sides' partnership agreement.

After helping the Andalusians to promote to the second division, Amaya's loan was renewed for 2010–11, but his contract with Granada was terminated on 26 August 2010. The next day, he was signed by Real Murcia of Segunda División B.

International career
Amaya was selected by Spain for their 2000 Summer Olympics squad. He helped the national team to win silver in Sydney but, in the decisive match against Cameroon, scored an own goal to make it 2–1 for the Europeans (eventually 2–2) and also missed his penalty shootout attempt, in an eventual loss.

Personal life
Amaya's younger brother, Antonio, was also a footballer – and a centre back. He also represented local club Rayo. 

The pair came from a Romani family.

Honours
Spain U23
Summer Olympic silver medal: 2000

References

External links

1978 births
Living people
Spanish Romani people
Spanish footballers
Footballers from Madrid
Romani footballers
Association football defenders
La Liga players
Segunda División players
Segunda División B players
Tercera División players
Rayo Vallecano B players
Rayo Vallecano players
Atlético Madrid footballers
RCD Espanyol footballers
Getafe CF footballers
Ciudad de Murcia footballers
Elche CF players
Granada CF footballers
Real Murcia players
UD San Sebastián de los Reyes players
Udinese Calcio players
Cypriot First Division players
Apollon Limassol FC players
Spain under-21 international footballers
Spain under-23 international footballers
Olympic footballers of Spain
Footballers at the 2000 Summer Olympics
Olympic medalists in football
Medalists at the 2000 Summer Olympics
Olympic silver medalists for Spain
Spanish expatriate footballers
Expatriate footballers in Cyprus
Spanish expatriate sportspeople in Cyprus